Joost Broerse (born 8 May 1979) is a Dutch former footballer who played as a centre back or defensive midfielder.

Club career

Groningen / Utrecht
Broerse made his debut in professional football, being part of the FC Groningen squad in the 1997–98 season and stayed there for six years. Then he moved to FC Utrecht, where he stayed for four years and won the 2003–04 KNVB Cup and the 2004 Johan Cruijff-schaal.

APOEL
Later, in January 2008, he transferred to Cypriot side APOEL. At APOEL he won the 2007–08 Cypriot Cup, the 2008–09 Cypriot First Division and also the Cypriot Super Cup of 2008 and 2009. He also appeared in four official group stages matches of the 2009–10 UEFA Champions League with APOEL. The next season, he won the 2010–11 Cypriot First Division again with APOEL, adding the second championship title to his honours list. In May 2011 it was announced that Broerse would be leaving APOEL after 3.5 years, as his contract would not be renewed by the club.

Excelsior / PEC Zwolle
In August 2011 he signed a one-year contract with the Dutch club Excelsior. In June 2012 he moved to PEC Zwolle, where he managed to win the 2013–14 KNVB Cup.

Broerse retired in 2015 to become commercial director at Zwolle.

Honours

Club
FC Utrecht
 KNVB Cup: 2003–04
 Johan Cruijff-schaal: 2004

APOEL
 Cypriot First Division: 2008–09, 2010–11
 Cypriot Cup: 2007–08
 Cypriot Super Cup: 2008, 2009

PEC Zwolle
 KNVB Cup: 2013–14
 Johan Cruijff-schaal: 2014

References

External links
 Official player homepage
 Voetbal International profile 
 

1979 births
Living people
People from De Bilt
Association football central defenders
Association football midfielders
Dutch footballers
Dutch expatriate footballers
Netherlands under-21 international footballers
Eredivisie players
Eerste Divisie players
Cypriot First Division players
Expatriate footballers in Cyprus
FC Groningen players
FC Utrecht players
Excelsior Rotterdam players
PEC Zwolle players
APOEL FC players
Dutch expatriate sportspeople in Cyprus
Footballers from Utrecht (province)